Santosia is a genus of Brazilian plants in the tribe Eupatorieae within the family Asteraceae.

The genus was named for Brazilian biologist Talmon S. dos Santos.

Species
The only known species is Santosia talmonii, native to the State of Bahia in eastern Brazil.

References

Endemic flora of Brazil
Eupatorieae
Monotypic Asteraceae genera